Three of Hearts: A Postmodern Family is a 2004 documentary film directed by Susan Kaplan and stars Sam Cagnina, Steven Margolin, and Samantha Singh. The film spans several years of a trinogamous relationship between two men and one woman.

External links
 

2004 films
Male bisexuality in film
American LGBT-related films
Documentary films about LGBT topics
Documentary films about families
2004 documentary films
American documentary films
Polyamory
2004 LGBT-related films
2000s English-language films
2000s American films